San Gemini is a comune (municipality) of c. 5,000 inhabitants in the province of Terni in the Italian region Umbria, located about 60 km south of Perugia and about 10 km northwest of Terni.

San Gemini borders the municipalities of Montecastrilli, Narni and Terni.

The town is a well-preserved medieval burgh with two lines of walls, built over the remains of a small Roman center along the old Via Flaminia. It is especially known for its mineral waters.

Main sights
San Gemini Cathedral or Duomo - a 12-century church dedicated to the commune's patron, the locally venerated Saint Gemine, whose relics were recovered in 1775, was rebuilt in 1817. Brother Gemine was a monk of Syrian origins who died in 815. The burial urn and original stone are conserved in the sacristy; the saint has been reburied under the high altar. The saint's day is 9 October.
Carsulae -Archeological site
[[San Nicolò, San Gemini|San Nicolò]] - Romanesque architecture church.San Francesco - Franciscan church with 15th-century frescoes.
Geolab, a permanent exhibition devoted to geological sciences.San Giovanni Battista -11th century churchSan Carlo'' -15th century church

References

External links
 Official website
 Associazione Pro San Gemini

Cities and towns in Umbria